Rosa Eriksen (born 26 February 1990) is a Danish politician, former reality TV star and Member of the Folketing for Funen from the Moderates. Alongside sixteen other members of The Moderates, Eriksen was elected to the Folketing in November 2022.

References

See also 

 List of members of the Folketing, 2022–present

Living people
1990 births
Place of birth missing (living people)
Moderates (Denmark) politicians
21st-century Danish politicians
21st-century Danish women politicians
Members of the Folketing 2022–2026
Women members of the Folketing
People from the Region of Southern Denmark
Participants in Danish reality television series

Danish nurses